The following list is a discography of production by Ronny J, an American hip hop record producer, rapper and singer from Miami, Florida. It includes a list of songs produced, co-produced and remixed by year, artist, album and title.

2013

Metro Zu - Z Unit
 08. "Bakwood"

Denzel Curry – Nostalgic 64
 02. "Zone 3" (produced with MarkMC9 and POSHstronaut)
 05. "Threatz" (featuring Yung Simmie and Robb Banks)
 06. "Mystical Virus, Pt. 3: The Scream" (featuring Lil Ugly Mane and Mike G) (produced with POSHstronaut and Bodega Creative Co.)

Raider Klan – Tales From the Underground
 06. "Ride Wit Me" (featuring Yung Simmie and Nell)

2014

Mike Zombie 
 "They Know" (With Kur)

Pouya 
 "Copy Cat"

2015

Denzel Curry – 32 Zel/Planet Shrooms
 03. "Envy Me"
 04. "Ultimate"

Ronny J
 "Vigorous" (featuring Denzel Curry and Keith Ape)

2016

Denzel Curry
 "SpaceGhostPussy" (featuring Lofty305, Ski Mask the Slump God, and XXXTentacion)
 "Purrposely" (featuring XXXTentacion)

Denzel Curry – Imperial
 01. "ULT" (produced with Nick Leon and FNZ)
 02. "Gook" (produced with FNZ and Lino Martinez)
 03. "Sick & Tired" (produced with FNZ)
 04. "Knotty Head" (featuring Rick Ross) (produced with FNZ)
 07. "Pure Enough" (produced with FNZ)
 08. "Zenith" (featuring Joey Badass) (produced with Freebase and FNZ)
 09. "This Life" (produced with FNZ)

Ronny J
 "IN THE FLESH"
 "Emoji" (feat. XXXTentacion)

Ski Mask The Slump God
 "NEWWORLDORDER" (feat. Lil Tracy and Lil Peep) (produced with Slight)

Ski Mask The Slump God- Drown In Designer & YouWillRegret (Reloaded)

 "Take A Step Back" (featuring XXXTentacion)
 "Dr. Eggman" (featuring Keith Ape)

XXXTentacion
 "#ImSippinTeaInYoHood"

Yoshi Thompkins
 "HIT THE DIRT" (featuring XXXTentacion)

2017

Bhad Bhabie – 15 
 11. "Hi Bich"

Bhad Bhabie 
 "Whachu Know"

Denzel Curry – 13
 03. "Equalizer" (featuring Ronny J)

Lil Pump 
 "Movin" (featuring Smokepurpp)

Lil Pump – Lil Pump 

 03. "Smoke My Dope" (featuring Smokepurpp)
 11. "Molly" (produced with Bighead)
 14. "Flex Like Ouu" (produced with Frank Dukes & Danny Wolf)

PnB Rock - Catch These Vibes 
 11. "3X" (featuring Smokepurpp)

Smokepurpp 
 "Geek A Lot"

Smokepurpp – Deadstar 
 01. "I Don't Know You" (featuring Chief Keef & Yo Gotti)
 02. "Drop"
 03. "Audi."
 04. "OK" (featuring Lil Pump)
 06. "No Safety"
 08. "Fingers Blue" (featuring Travis Scott)
 09. "Nose"
 16. "Phantom"

XXXTentacion – A Ghetto Christmas Carol
 01. "A Ghetto Christmas Carol" (produced with Cubeatz)
 02. "hate will never win" (produced with J Dilla)
 03. "Up Like an Insomniac Freestyle" (produced with XXXTentacion)
 04. "Red Light!"

XXXTentacion

 "#PROUDCATOWNER #IHATERAPPERS #IEATPUSSY"

2018

CA$HPASSION 
 "Feel"

Comethazine- BAW$KEE 
 07. "Let It Eat" (featuring Ugly God)
 09. "Bring Dat Bag Out" (featuring Lil Yachty)

Denzel Curry – TA13OO
 06. "SWITCH IT UP | ZW1TCH 1T UP" (produced with Illmind)
 13. "BLACK METAL TERRORIST | 13 M T" (produced with FNZ, Taz Taylor, and M-Sol)

Desiigner – L.O.D.
 01. "Priice Tag"

Eminem – Kamikaze
 01. "The Ringer" (produced with Illa da Producer and Eminem)
 08. "Not Alike" (featuring Royce da 5'9") (produced with Tay Keith and Cubeatz)

Famous Dex 
 "Ronny J On The Beat"
 "Up" (featuring Ski Mask the Slump God & Reggie Mills)

Famous Dex - Dex Meets Dexter 
 08. "HEMI"

Iggy Azalea – Survive the Summer
 03. "Kream" (featuring Tyga) (produced with GT and Wallis Lane)

Jasiah 
 "Shenanigans" (featuring Yung Bans)

Kid Buu - Blind for Love 
 02. "On Me"

KYLE
 "SUPERDUPERKYLE" (feat. MadeinTYO)

leavemealone 
 "Face"
 "No Smoke"

Lil Pump – Harverd Dropout 
 03. "I Love It" (with Kanye West) (produced with Kanye West, DJ Clark Kent and CBMix

LottoMoney 
 "Fee Fi Fo Fum" (featuring 12svnteen and Tankhead)

Machine Gun Kelly – Binge
 04. "Rap Devil" (produced with Nils)
 06. "Lately" (produced with Nils and SlimXX)

MadeinTYO - Sincerely, Tokyo
 05. "Outstanding" (produced with Wallis Lane)

Ronny J 
 "Doesn't Matter"
 "WOTR"
 "CHOKER"
 "Loui'd Down" (featuring Ski Mask the Slump God)
 "BUTTERFLIES"

Ronny J - OMGRONNY 
 01. "Thriller (Forever)" (featuring Ski Mask the Slump God)
 02. "One Time" (featuring Smokepurpp)
 03. "824"
 04. "Glacier" (featuring Denzel Curry)
 05. "Costa Rica" (featuring Ski Mask the Slump God) (produced with Cubeatz)
 06. "Fiji Island" (featuring Fat Nick)
 07. "Snakes" (featuring Wifisfuneral)
 08. "OHSHI"
 09. "Trauma" (featuring Nell and Danny Towers)
 10. "Houston" (featuring Denzel Curry)
 11. "Banded Up" (featuring XXXTentacion)

Ski Mask the Slump God - Stokeley 
 04. "LA LA"

Smokepurpp 
 "Big Bucks"

Ufo361
 "Power" (featuring Capital Bra) (produced with Sonus030)
 "Kein Fugazi"

Uno The Activist 
 "Ronny J Please Turn Me Up"

Wifisfuneral - Ethernet 
 03. "Genesis" (produced with Cubeatz)

XXXTentacion

 "Shining Like the Northstar"

Yoshi Thompkins 
 "The Punisher"

Zoey Dollaz – Who Don't Like Dollaz 2 
 03. "Moonwalk" (featuring Moneybagg Yo) (produced with Cubeatz)

10k.Caash 
 "FUN"

458 KEEZ 
 "Batmobile" (feat. Ski Mask the Slump God & Wifisfuneral)

6ix9ine - Dummy Boy
 07. "Bebe" (feat. Anuel AA)

Scarlxrd
 "Nx ice"

2019

Denzel Curry - ZUU 
 12. "P.A.T." (feat. PlayThatBoiZay) (produced with FNZ)

DJ Scheme - Preseason EP 
 02. How You Feel? (Freestyle) [produced with DJ Scheme]

Higher Brothers - Five Stars 
 04. "One Punch Man" (feat. Ski Mask the Slump God and Denzel Curry)

leavemealone 
 "HOP"

Lil Yachty 
 "GO KRAZY, GO STUPID FREESTYLE" (produced with Heavy Mellow)

Machine Gun Kelly - Hotel Diablo 
 02. "El Diablo" (produced with Nils)

Ronny J 
 "Star"
 "PHILIPP PLEIN (Freestyle)"
 "INMYTHOUGHTS"
 "CHANEL FREESTYLE :)" (produced with V1T0 and Fewtile)
 "Gucci Lips"
 "Lights Out" (feat. Ty Dolla Sign & Rich The Kid)
 "Stack It Up" (feat. Lil Pump)

Ski Mask The Slump God 
 "Carbonated Water: (Single)

2020

Machine Gun Kelly 
 "Bullet with Names" (feat.Young Thug, RJMrLA and Lil Duke)

Token 
 "Curfew" (Single)

J Balvin - Colores 
 "Verde" (featuring and produced with Sky Rompiendo)

Ronny J 
 "Miami" (feat. Sfera Ebbasta, Duki)

Kanye West 
 "Wash Us in the Blood" (feat. Travis Scott)

Juice WRLD - Legends Never Die 
 "Conversations"

2023

Lil Pump - Lil Pump 2 
13. "Move It"

References

Production discographies